Bowbazar Assembly constituency was a Legislative Assembly constituency of Kolkata district in the Indian state of West Bengal.

Overview
As a consequence of the orders of the Delimitation Commission, Bowbazar Assembly constituency ceases to exist from 2011.
 
It was part of Calcutta North West (Lok Sabha constituency).

Members of Legislative Assembly

Results

1977-2009

2009 Bye-election
A bye-election was held on 18 August 2009 following the resignation of the sitting MLA, Sudip Banerjee who was elected as MP In Parliament from Kolkata Uttar (Lok Sabha constituency).

In This Election, Swarnakamal Saha of Trinamool Congress Defeated Minati Gomez of CPIM - Supported Independent.

2006
In the 2006 election, Sudip Bandyopadhyay of Congress defeated his nearest rival Rekha Singh of CPIM.

2001
In the 2001 election, Nayna Bandyopadhyay of Trinamool Congress defeated his nearest rival Ajit Pandey of CPIM.

1998 Bye-election
A bye-election was held on  3 June 1998 following the resignation of the sitting MLA, Sudip Bandyopadhyay who was elected as MP In Parliament from Calcutta North West (Lok Sabha constituency).

1996
In the 1996 election, Sudip Bandyopadhyay of Congress defeated his nearest rival Sujit Mandal of Janata Dal.

1991
In the 1991 election, Sudip Bandyopadhyay of Congress defeated his nearest rival Joytilak Guharoy of CPIM.

1987
In the 1987 election, Sudip Bandyopadhyay of Congress defeated his nearest rival Md. Ismail of CPIM.

1982
In the 1982 election, Abdul Rauf Ansari of Congress defeated his nearest rival Abul Hasan of CPIM.

1977
In the 1977 election, Abul Hasan of CPIM defeated his nearest rival Bijoy Krishna Dhandhania of Janata Party.

 
 

 

In the 2009 by-election, necessitated by the election of sitting MLA, Sudip Bandyopadhyay, to the Parliament from the Kolkata Uttar (Lok Sabha constituency), Swarnakamal Saha of Trinamool Congress won the 145 Bowbazar assembly seat. In 2006, the seat was won by Sudip Bandyopadhyay of Congress defeating Rekha Singh of CPI(M). In 2001, the seat was won by Nayana Bandopadhyay of Trinamool Congress defeating Ajit Pandey of CPI(M). Sudip Bandopadhyay of Congress won the seat defeating Sujit Mandal of JD in 1996, Joytilak Guha Roy of JD in 1991 and Md. Ismail of CPI(M) in 1987. In 1982, Abdul Rauf Ansari of Congress defeated Abul Hasan of CPI(M). In 1977, Abul Hasan of CPI(M) won the seat defeating Bijoy Krishna Dhandhania of Congress.

1951-1972
Bijay Singh Nahar of Congress won the seat defeating Hashim Abdul Halim of CPI(M) in 1972 and 1971, D.C.Bhowmick of Forward Block in 1969, S.Gupta of Forward Bloc and H,Chatterjee and CPI(M) in 1967 and Md. Ismail of CPI in 1962.Dr. Bidhan Chandra Roy won the seat in 1957 defeating Md. Ismail of CPI by a narrow margin of 540 votes and Satyapriya Banerjee of Forward Bloc (Marxists) in independent India’s first election in 1951.

References

Former assembly constituencies of West Bengal
Politics of Kolkata district